Word on tha Streets is the debut solo studio album by American rapper Bad Azz from Long Beach, California. It was released on September 29, 1998 via Priority Records. It features guest appearances from Big Tray Deee, Kurupt, Lil' Beau, Low Life Gangstas, Ms. Legacy, Outlawz, Snoop Dogg, The Comrads and The Lady of Rage. The album peaked at #182 on the Billboard 200 and #32 on the Top R&B/Hip-Hop Albums charts in the United States.

Tracks listing

Sample credits
Track 1 contains elements from "Get Up Offa That Thing" by James Brown, "South Bronx" by Boogie Down Productions, "Parental Discretion Iz Advised" by N.W.A, "More Bounce to the Ounce" by Zapp, "Message to B.A." by N.W.A
Track 2 contains elements from "Friends" by Whodini, "Everybody Loves the Sunshine" by Roy Ayers
Track 5 contains elements from "Everything Good to You (Ain't Always Good for You)" by B.T. Express 
Track 8 contains elements from "Get Up Offa That Thing" by James Brown, "South Bronx" by Boogie Down Productions
Track 17 contains elements from "Buildings and Bridges" by Ani DiFranco

Chart history

References

External links

Word On the Streets by Bad Azz on iTunes

1998 debut albums
Gangsta rap albums by American artists
Bad Azz (rapper) albums
Priority Records albums
Albums produced by DJ Pooh
Albums produced by Soopafly
Albums produced by Ant Banks